Thích Thanh Từ (born 24 July 1924) is a Vietnamese Zen Buddhist monk. He has been influential with increasing traditional Vietnamese Buddhism practices within the country.

Biography
Thích Thanh Từ began his life in a well-educated family that followed Cao Đài, a Vietnamese religion founded in 1926. He was born on July 24, 1924 in Cần Thơ, Vietnam with the birth name of Trần Hữu Phước. He was determined to become a Buddhist monk after noticing the suffering of his people during wartime and after 3 months of Buddhist duties and at the age of 25 was given his Buddhist name which he is now known by, Thích Thanh Từ. After 3 years of servicing as an expression of gratitude towards his master he finally decided to leave so he could find his true self, which resulted in secluding himself in a meditation chamber that he built in 1966. This led him to discover the concept of Nothingness after many of attempts at other meditation practices. Realizing how powerful his meditation can be he wanted to engage with the public and teach the Buddhist ways and lived by the phrase "After realization, enlighten others.".

Teachings
Thích Thanh Từ began his teachings in December 1971 with only 10 students and involved scriptures, discourses, history and meditation methods. His focus is to be aware of any false thoughts, but prevent from attaching to them. Three years later opened three new monasteries which included Linh Quang, Chân Không, Bát Nhã monasteries. From the initial 10 students he taught, he went on to teach thousands of other monks and nuns to pass on his dharma teachings. He also founded Thường Chiếu monastery (1974) in Long Thành which became the headquarters of his organization in 1986. Thích Thanh Từ discovered meditation to help improve the common practice of Vietnamese Zen in Vietnam, mainly at the site of the Trúc Lâm school. His practice methods are constructed from 3 important keys in historical Zen from China, which consists of patriarch Huệ Khả, Huệ Năng, and Trúc Lâm Đầu Đà. He put together their enlightened ideas and practice which they now practice in his monasteries’. He refers to the "Transmission of the Lamp" as one of the main objectives of distributing his teachings among his students of the Trúc Lâm philosophies. He talks about lighting 10 to 20 torches which will then light 30 to 40 torches in order to light up the whole world.

Trúc Lâm

History
Trúc Lâm was founded in and around the time of Trần Nhân Tông (1258–1308) who was a former king of Vietnam. The first Trúc Lâm Temple was on top of Yên Tử Mountain where Nhan Tong retired to. This was the only school of Zen that was founded in Vietnam instead of originating from China. The Trúc Lâm sect grew enormously with the help of the next 2 patriarchs, Pháp Loa and Huyền Quang. Once they came to the end of their time, the school successfully came to an end. After many attempts to revive the school, Thích Thanh Từ is the most recent and becoming the most successful monk to restore Trúc Lâm. He built a monastery in Yên Tử Mountain to re-connect the meaning of Trúc Lâm to its origin, and while using this name, is able to strengthen the impact of his movement. Although it can be argued that what he had created was not original Trúc Lâm Buddhism but still had a positive effect on the reform of Buddhism on the global level.

Thích Thanh Từ's influence
His efforts are brought forth from the principles of 3 patriarchs whom he believes have very minimal amounts of transition from traditional Chinese Buddhism. Thích Thanh Từ claims to be re-establishing the Trúc Lâm traditions but in his own way has modified it from its original ways. He wasn't much of a global influence in his earlier years of work, but in recent history has been on top of Buddhist movements on the global level. His initial work in Vietnam has now moved onwards to western civilization by getting his word across through the translation of books that he has written. He is having the most influence on today's view on Buddhism and what it means to be a Buddhist monk through the implementation of the revived religion referred to as Trúc Lâm.

Writings
Thích Thanh Từ started writing in 1961 and in over 45 years has written over 50 books.

 My Whole Life
 The Source of Buddhist Dharmas
 The Carefree Leaves
 If You Know
 Buddhism and the Youths
 The Practicing Method of Vietnamese Zen

References

Sources
Philip Taylor, Modernity and Re-enchantment: Religion in Post-revolutionary Vietnam (Maryland, USA, 2008)

External links
Pháp thoại của thầy Thích Thanh Từ
http://www.truclamvietzen.net
http://catalogue.nla.gov.au/Record/985459
http://eng.tvdaidang.org/dharma.html
http://www.truclamvietzen.net/BookAudio.htm
http://www.truclamvietzen.net/MasterTTT.htm

Vietnamese Buddhist monks
Vietnamese non-fiction writers
Thiền Buddhists
Vietnamese Zen Buddhists
Zen Buddhist spiritual teachers
Living people
1924 births
People from Cần Thơ
Converts to Buddhism
Zen Buddhism writers
20th-century Buddhist monks
21st-century Buddhist monks
20th-century non-fiction writers
21st-century non-fiction writers
20th-century Vietnamese writers
21st-century Vietnamese writers